The 2008–09 Biathlon World Cup/World Cup 6 was held in Rasen-Antholz, Italy, from Thursday January 22 until Sunday January 25, 2009. After this leg the biathletes traveled to Pyeongchang, South Korea for the Biathlon World Championships 2009.

Schedule of events
The schedule of the event is below.

Results

Men

Women

References 

Biathlon World Cup - World Cup 6, 2008-09
January 2009 sports events in Europe
Biathlon competitions in Italy
2009 in Italian sport